Geuda Springs is a city in Cowley and Sumner counties in the U.S. state of Kansas.  As of the 2020 census, the population of the city was 158.

History

On the line between Cowley and Sumner counties is a remarkable group of salt springs that put out 100 to 450 gallons each per hour and have been known since the earliest settlement of that region. The waters from these springs infiltrate the waters of the nearby creeks. Geuda is said to be an Indian word, Ge-u-da, meaning healing springs, and the place must have been a well known stopping place with the Indians. Many improvements were made at the springs during the late 1880s, including a bath-house and hotel, lake improvements, and new automobile access. Much of the water has been bottled and shipped to points in Kansas and adjoining states. About 1890, a dam with a flume outlet was built across the salt marsh just north of the springs, which filled the marsh with water and created a lake large enough for recreational boating.

Later in the 1900s, the population of Geuda Springs slowly declined. During the 1950s, Geuda Springs had a bar which featured slot machines, dancing and music. A volunteer fire department exists to protect the town and the surrounding area but primary fire protection is provided by Arkansas City. In the 1990s, a new community center was built for the residents.  It is surrounded by homes over 80 years of age and an old church building. Geuda Springs has a cemetery to the northwest of town with tombstones dating to the 1870s. One notable gunfighter Luke Short, died in Geuda Springs in 1893 of congestive heart failure.

Geography
Geuda Springs is located at  (37.112264, -97.150870).

Demographics

2010 census
As of the census of 2010, there were 185 people, 77 households, and 47 families living in the city. The racial makeup of the city was 97.8% White, 0.5% Native American, 0.5% Pacific Islander, and 1.1% from two or more races. Hispanic or Latino of any race were 0.5% of the population.

There were 77 households, of which 27.3% had children under the age of 18 living with them, 45.5% were married couples living together, 9.1% had a female householder with no husband present, 6.5% had a male householder with no wife present, and 39.0% were non-families. 35.1% of all households were made up of individuals, and 14.3% had someone living alone who was 65 years of age or older. The average household size was 2.40 and the average family size was 3.04.

The median age in the city was 36.8 years. 25.4% of residents were under the age of 18; 7.5% were between the ages of 18 and 24; 24.3% were from 25 to 44; 26.9% were from 45 to 64; and 15.7% were 65 years of age or older. The gender makeup of the city was 53.5% male and 46.5% female.

2000 census
As of the census of 2000, there were 212 people, 85 households, and 58 families living in the city. The racial makeup of the city was 98.58% White, 0.47% Native American, and 0.94% from two or more races. Hispanic or Latino of any race were 1.89% of the population.

There were 85 households, out of which 22.4% had children under the age of 18 living with them, 58.8% were married couples living together, 9.4% had a female householder with no husband present, and 30.6% were non-families. 28.2% of all households were made up of individuals, and 11.8% had someone living alone who was 65 years of age or older. The average household size was 2.49 and the average family size was 3.03.

In the city, the population was spread out, with 21.7% under the age of 18, 12.7% from 18 to 24, 23.1% from 25 to 44, 27.4% from 45 to 64, and 15.1% who were 65 years of age or older. The median age was 41 years. For every 100 females, there were 92.7 males. For every 100 females age 18 and over, there were 90.8 males.

The median income for a household in the city was $38,250, and the median income for a family was $41,250. Males had a median income of $28,750 versus $17,639 for females. The per capita income for the city was $12,787. About 14.7% of families and 16.0% of the population were below the poverty line, including 17.4% of those under the age of eighteen and none of those 65 or over.

Education
The community is served by Oxford USD 358 public school district.

References

Further reading

External links
 Geuda Springs - Directory of Public Officials
 Geuda Springs city map, KDOT

Cities in Kansas
Cities in Cowley County, Kansas
Cities in Sumner County, Kansas
Wichita, KS Metropolitan Statistical Area
Kansas populated places on the Arkansas River